Camote cue or camotecue is a popular snack food in the Philippines made from camote (sweet potato).  Slices of camote are coated with brown sugar and then fried to cook the potatoes and to caramelize the sugar. It is one of the most common street foods in the Philippines, along with bananacue and turon.

The term is a portmanteau of "camote" and "barbecue", the latter in Philippine English refers to meat cooked in a style similar to kebabs. Though served skewered on bamboo sticks, it is not cooked on the stick. The skewer is purely for easier handling as it is usually sold as street food.

See also 
 Ginanggang
 List of sweet potato dishes
 Maruya

References 

Philippine desserts
Snack foods
Street food
Deep fried foods
Sweet potatoes